Leszek Jacek Pękalski, known as The Vampire of Bytów (born 12 February 1966 in Osieki near Bytów, Poland) is a Polish murderer and suspected serial killer. He is believed to have killed at least 17 people between 1984 and 1992. At some stages of the criminal proceedings, he admitted to having killed as many as 80 people; which he later retracted.

Nevertheless, due to problems with the collection of evidence, he was convicted for only one murder. Pękalski is set to be released in December 2017, then transferred to a National Center for the Prevention of Dyssocial Behavior in Gostynin for evaluation.

See also
List of serial killers by country

References

1950 births
20th-century Polish criminals
21st-century Polish criminals
Living people
People convicted of murder by Poland
Polish people convicted of murder
Suspected serial killers